The For Those About to Rock Tour (also known as the Cannon and Bell Tour) was a concert tour by the Australian hard rock band AC/DC, in support of their eighth studio album, For Those About to Rock We Salute You, which was released on 20 November 1981.

Background
The For Those About to Rock Tour began with a North American leg in November 1981, with Japan and European legs throughout 1982. It was the first tour to feature two cannons on stage, which appeared during the band's encore, though it was not used at every show due to some venues refusing to let them use them.

It was the last tour to feature Phil Rudd on drums, due to issues regarding his addictions to drinking and drugs, as well as having caused the European tour that was set to begin in August to be cancelled and later rescheduled. Following an argument with Malcolm Young, Phil was fired from the band, and did not return until 1994.

During the North American tour, Midnight Flyer was the supporting act for the band. Y&T was the opening act for the band during the shows in the United Kingdom.

Reception
Peter Robb from the Windsor Star who attended the second night at Cobo Hall in Detroit, gave the show a mixed review, opening that the band had succeeded to the top of heavy rock, but failed to innovate beyond the notability of bands like Slade and Bloodrock. Robb did however, state that AC/DC worked hard for their fans and gave each song they performed that night a marathon of effort for the audience whose cheers rose loud above the speakers when an older hit was performed.

Douglas E. Hall from Billboard, stated in his review that the band put on a hell of a show for a packed enthusiastic audience at Madison Square Garden, which had chanted along with the band's songs frequently, giving a big reaction when the band began performing the song "Dirty Deeds Done Dirt Cheap" whilst the band gave a set of high energy and straight ahead rock 'n' roll, and delivering an impressive finale with simulated cannon blasts.

Lakeland Ledgers Rick Wilbur opened his review, stating that the sold out house of delighted and complacent heavy metal fans were "electrified" by the band, led by an energetic stage presence delivered by guitarist Angus Young, whom Wilbur had claimed stole the show with his showmanship and adroit musicianship. Malcolm Young, Williams and Rudd were also praised, sounding tight and appropriately high volume while Johnson's high energy screeches pleased the most demanding of fans. Wilbur later concluded his review, stating that while it wasn't harmonic and pleasant music, it was undeniably an effective heavy metal show that sounded good enough to support the thesis that AC/DC is a leader in the heavy metal interest.

Setlist
 "Hells Bells" or "Live Wire"
 "Have a Drink on Me"
 "Shot Down in Flames" or "C.O.D."
 "Sin City"
 "Shoot to Thrill"
 "Put the Finger on You"
 "Back in Black"
 "Bad Boy Boogie"
 "Rock and Roll Ain't Noise Pollution"
 "The Jack"
 "What Do You Do For Money Honey"
 "Highway to Hell"
 "Let's Get It Up"
 "Dirty Deeds Done Dirt Cheap"
 "Whole Lotta Rosie"
 "Let There Be Rock"Encore'
 "You Shook Me All Night Long"
 "For Those About to Rock (We Salute You)"
 "T.N.T."

Tour dates

Box office score data

Personnel
Angus Young – lead guitar
Cliff Williams – bass guitar, backing vocals
Malcolm Young – rhythm guitar, backing vocals
Phil Rudd – drums
Brian Johnson – lead vocals

References

Citations

Sources
 
 
 

AC/DC concert tours
1981 concert tours
1982 concert tours